Fougamou Airport  is an airport serving the village of Fougamou in the Ngounié Province of Gabon.

See also

 List of airports in Gabon
 Transport in Gabon

References

External links
Fougamou Airport
OpenStreetMap - Fougamou
OurAirports - Fougamou

Airports in Gabon